Mansun Chan is an Alex Wong Siu Wah Gigi Wong Fook Chi Professor of Engineering and Chair Professor at the Department of Electronic & Computer Engineering, HKUST and Director of Nanoelectronics Fabrication Facility/Adjunct Professor, Peking University Shenzhen Graduate School. He was named Fellow of the Institute of Electrical and Electronics Engineers (IEEE) in 2013 for contributions to CMOS device modeling.

Education
Chan obtained his BS degree in Electrical Engineering (highest honors) and BS degree in Computer Sciences (highest honors) in 1990 and 1991 respectively, both from University of California, San Diego. He then got his MS degree in 1994 and PhD degree in 1995 from the University of California, Berkeley.

References

External links

20th-century births
Living people
University of California, San Diego alumni
UC Berkeley College of Letters and Science alumni
Academic staff of the Hong Kong University of Science and Technology
Academic staff of Peking University
Fellow Members of the IEEE
Year of birth missing (living people)
Place of birth missing (living people)